John Wayne Catlett is an American politician and a Democratic former member of the Arkansas House of Representatives for District 73 from 2013 to 2015. Catlett also served from January 2011 until January 14, 2013, in the District 61 seat.

He was defeated for reelection in the November 4, 2014 general election by the Republican Mary Bentley of Perryville.

Education
Catlett earned his bachelor's degree in history and political science from Arkansas Tech University.

Elections
In 2010, after District 61 Representative Nathan George left the legislature, Catlett won the May 18, 2010 Democratic Primary with 2,118 votes (57 percent), and won the November 2, 2010 general election by 34 votes with 3,278 votes (50.2%) against Republican nominee Kelly Boyd.

In 2012, Catlett was redistricted to District 73, and with Representative James Ratliff redistricted to District 60, Catlett was unopposed for the May 22, 2012 Democratic Primary and won the November 6, 2012 general election with 4,088 votes (52.2%) against Republican nominee Mary Bentley. Bentley ran again in 2014 and unseated Catlett with 3,588 (51.4%) votes to his 3,392 (48.5%).

References

External links
Official page at the Arkansas House of Representatives
Campaign site
John Catlett at Ballotpedia
John Catlett at the National Institute on Money in State Politics

Place of birth missing (living people)
Year of birth missing (living people)
Living people
Arkansas Tech University alumni
Democratic Party members of the Arkansas House of Representatives
People from Yell County, Arkansas